The following is a timeline of the history of the municipality of Leuven, Belgium.

Prior to 20th century

 883 – .
 891 – Battle of Leuven (891).
 950 - Birth of Lambert I, Count of Louvain the first Count of Leuven. 
 1090 – Hospital established (approximate date).
 1100 – St. Peter's Church built (approximate date).
 1165 –  built.
 1183 – Leuven becomes part of the Duchy of Brabant of the Holy Roman Empire.
 1222 – Saint Quentin's Church built (approx. date).
 1225 –  becomes mayor.
 1230 –  built.
 1317 –  (cloth hall) built.
 1356 - Louvain was the scene of the Joyeuse Entrée of Wenceslas.
 1379 –  (political unrest).
 1425 – Old University of Leuven founded by John IV, Duke of Brabant.
 1463 – Leuven Town Hall built.
 1474 – Printing press in operation.
 1497 – St. Peter's Church rebuilt.
 1502 – Erasmus moves to Leuven.
 1547 - Leuven Vulgate edited by Hentenius published in Louvain.
 1571 – City Archive relocated to City Hall.
 1635 – June–July: Siege of Leuven. 
 1717 – Artois brewery in business.
 1727 – Public celebration on 10 November of the third centenary of the university's founding.
 1738 – Hortus Botanicus Lovaniensis (botanical garden) established.
 1786 – Seminary established.
 1795 – City becomes part of the Dyle (department) of the French First Republic.
 1804 – City becomes part of the First French Empire.
 1815 – City becomes part of the United Kingdom of the Netherlands.
 1830 – City becomes part of the Kingdom of Belgium.
 1831 – 12 August: Battle of Leuven (1831).
 1834 – Catholic University of Leuven established.
 1837 - Leuven railway station opened.
 1843 – Heilige Drievuldigheidscollege (school) established.
 1867 –  built on Statiestraat.
 1883 – Population: 36,813.
 1899 – Keizersberg Abbey founded.

20th century

 1903 – K. Stade Leuven football club formed.
 1904 - Population: 42,194.
 1914
 Burning of Louvain Library of the Catholic University of Leuven destroyed.
 Population: 42,490.
 1919 – Population: 40,069.
 1921
 Post war reconstruction well underway, about 700 out of 1,200 houses had been rebuilt.
 New purpose-built library was begun, helped by John Rylands Library in Manchester.
 1928
 UZ Leuven (hospital) active.
 Library of the Catholic University of Leuven rebuilt.
 1940 – Library of the Catholic University of Leuven destroyed again.
 1947 –  becomes mayor.
 1967 – November: French–Flemish  begins.
 1968
 Katholieke Universiteit Leuven established.
 Lemmensinstituut (music conservatory) active.
 Studio 1 cinema in business.
 1977
 Heverlee, Kessel-Lo, and Wilsele become part of city.
  becomes mayor.
 1982 – Marktrock music fest begins.
 1988 – Vlaams Filmmuseum en -archief (Flemish film museum) established.
 1995
 Louis Tobback becomes mayor.
 City becomes part of the Flemish Brabant province.
  (school) established.
 1998 – Grand Béguinage designated an UNESCO World Heritage Site.

21st century

 2002
 Oud-Heverlee Leuven football club formed.
 Den Dreef stadium opens in Heverlee.
 2008 – Anheuser-Busch InBev headquartered in city.
 2011 – Cyclocross Leuven begins.
 2013 – Population: 97,656.
 2021 - 2021 UCI Road World Championships road race events finish in Leuven.

See also
 Leuven history
 
 List of mayors of Leuven
 
 Other names of Leuven
 List of colleges of Leuven University
 Timelines of other municipalities in Belgium: Antwerp, Bruges, Brussels, Ghent, Liège

References

This article incorporates information from the Dutch Wikipedia and French Wikipedia.

Bibliography

Published in the 18th-19th c.
 
 
 
 
 
 
 

Published in the 20th c.
 
  (+ 1881 ed.)

External links

 Digital Public Library of America. Items related to Leuven, various dates

 
Leuven
Leuven
Years in Belgium